Smoggie or Smoggy is a nickname given to people from Teesside, Northern England, as well as the local accent and dialect. It originated with visiting football supporters and is a contraction of 'smog monster'.

History
Originally, this was a term of abuse for supporters of Middlesbrough F.C. coined by their Sunderland A.F.C. counterparts.  The name was meant to refer to the heavy air pollution once produced by the local petrochemical industry, and from Dorman Long. Though, at first, Smoggie was used as a pejorative term, it has become an example of reappropriation with many people now proudly calling themselves 'Smoggies'.

Current usage
Primarily directed at people from Teesside, 'Smoggies' is often used to describe the areas of Teesside with a noticeable amount of industry. The term was referred to by Middlesbrough South and East Cleveland MP, Tom Blenkinsop, in the House of Commons, and was recorded in Hansard, in July 2011. Smoggies has occasional use as a nickname for Middlesbrough F.C.. In 2013 the Cleveland Art Society organised a major exhibition of the works of local artists entitled Smoggies Allowed in an Art Gallery.

Characteristics
Due to the rapid growth of Teesside in the 19th century, Smoggie represents an example of new dialect formation and was influenced by Northumbrian, Yorkshire and Hiberno-English. Despite its mixed origins, it is considered part of the urban North East dialect area, forming the 'Southern Urban North-Eastern English' dialect region including Hartlepool and Darlington.

Phonology
 Like most North East dialects, the definite article is always full and never reduced to t' as in the Yorkshire dialect. 
 Final unstressed /i/ is a tense [i] rather than a lax [ɪ]. This mirrors other North Eastern dialects and contrasts with Yorkshire English.
 H-dropping is common in informal speech. This is considered unusual among most North East dialects but is shared with Mackem.
/l/ is typically more velarised than in other North East dialects.
 Square–nurse merger: the vowel in word, heard, nurse, etc. is pronounced in the same way as in square, dare.
 The phoneme  (as in prize) may become a monophthong  before a voiced consonant. For example, five becomes  (fahve), prize becomes  (prahze).
 The FACE vowel is typically [eː], or sometimes more rarely [ɪə] or [ɜː].
 The GOOSE vowel is typically [ɪʉ] or [ʉː].
 The START vowel is typically more fronted than in upper North East varieties, thus park is typically pronounced [paːk].
 In conservative forms of the dialect make and take are pronounced mek and tek ( and ). These contrast with the Sunderland and Durham variants mak and tak but are counterintuitively shared with broad Geordie.

Vocabulary
Smoggie is characterised by a relative lack of Northumbrianisms in comparison to Geordie, Mackem, and Pitmatic (upper North East dialects). Markedly North-Eastern forms such as divvent or dinnet for "don't" and gan for "go" are more rare on Teesside.
However, a limited number of Northumbrian words are still found in the dialect, such as bairn and canny.
The emphatic interjection well aye corresponds to the upper North East whey aye or Scots och aye.
’oway or ’owee corresponds to Geordie howay or Mackem haway. On Teesside the h is always dropped.

See also
 Mackem
 Monkey hanger

References

Bibliography

External links 
Lower Tees Dialect Society

English language in England
Regional nicknames
Middlesbrough